Shiraz County is in Fars province, Iran. The capital of the county is the city of Shiraz. At the 2006 census, the county's population was 1,676,927 in 427,268 households. The following census in 2011 counted 1,700,687 people in 481,239 households, by which time Kavar District had been separated from the county to form Kavar County, Korbal District to become Kherameh County, and Sarvestan District to form Sarvestan County. At the 2016 census, Shiraz County's population was 1,869,001 in 567,567 households.

Administrative divisions

The population history and structural changes of Shiraz County's administrative divisions over three consecutive censuses are shown in the following table. The latest census shows three districts, 12 rural districts, and six cities.

References

 

Counties of Fars Province